Kala Keerthi Pasquel Ge Don Augustine Ivor Dennis (28 May 1932 – 18 June 2018) was a popular Sri Lankan veteran playback singer who was also known as the former student of veteran icon Sunil Santha. He was well known for establishing long time relationship with legendary musician Sunil Santha, who is known as one of the icons and pioneers of Sinhala music. He had worked as a playback singer in many Sinhala films including Sri Lanka's first Sinhala film Rekava. He died on 18 June 2018 at his home in Seeduwa at the age of 86.

Career 
He pursued his career as a vocalist and took part in a song competition at Radio Ceylon in 1952. He sang veteran musician Sunil Santha's famous song Waren Heen Sare Redhee Walave during the competition and his performance was sooner recognised by Sunil Santha who also came forward to teach music for the latter. Ivor was pursued by Sunil Santha to croon a song on his own and Ivor recorded his first song Kurulu Paradiseye, which became an evergreen hit. He had also performed in many concerts in various countries including Japan, Indonesia, Italy, England and New Zealand.

He made his film debut as a singer which coincidentally came in Sri Lanka's first Sinhala film Rekava which was released in 1955. He was promoted as an A grade singer at Radio Ceylon in 1958. He notably won the Presidential Award for the Best Playback singer for the film Hima Kathara. He was honored with the prestigious Kala Keerthi award during the 2017 Sri Lankan national honours, for his outstanding contributions to the Sinhala cinema.

Discography 

 1956 - Rekava
 1960 - Sandesaya
 2007 - Ai Oba Thaniwela

References 

1932 births
2018 deaths
20th-century Sri Lankan male singers
Sinhalese singers
Sri Lankan Christians
Sri Lankan Roman Catholics
Alumni of Maris Stella College
People from Gampaha District